Sir Andrew Noel Agnew, 9th Baronet, JP (14 August 1850 – 14 July 1928) was a British Liberal Unionist Member of Parliament.

Succession
Agnew was the son of Sir Andrew Agnew, 8th Baronet and Lady Mary Arabella Louisa Noel, and succeeded his father as 9th Baronet, of Lochnaw on the latter's death on 25 March 1892. On his own death in 1928 he was succeeded in the baronetcy by his nephew Fulque Agnew.

Education
He attended Windlesham House School, Harrow School and Trinity College, Cambridge.

Career
Agnew was commissioned a second lieutenant in the 1st Ayrshire and Galloway Artillery Volunteers on 28 February 1900, and rose to the rank of captain before he retired. He was Liberal Unionist Member of Parliament (MP) for Edinburgh South from 1900 to 1906. He was appointed a Deputy Lieutenant of Wigtownshire on 21 March 1904. He was Justice of the Peace for Wigtownshire.

Family

He married Gertrude Vernon, daughter of Hon. Gowran Charles Vernon and Caroline Fazakerley, on 15 October 1889, but the marriage produced no children. Lady Agnew was the subject of a famous portrait by John Singer Sargent.

References

thePeerage.com
'AGNEW, Sir Andrew Noel', Who Was Who, A & C Black, 1920–2007; online edition, Oxford University Press, Dec 2007

External links 
 

1850 births
1928 deaths
Andrew
Alumni of Trinity College, Cambridge
Baronets in the Baronetage of Nova Scotia
Liberal Unionist Party MPs for Scottish constituencies
Members of the Parliament of the United Kingdom for Edinburgh constituencies
UK MPs 1900–1906
Deputy Lieutenants of Wigtownshire
People educated at Harrow School
People educated at Windlesham House School